The women's 4 × 100 metres relay event at the 1928 Olympic Games took place between August 4 & August 5.

Results

Heats

Heat 1

Key: Q = Qualified, WR = World record

Heat 2

Key: Q = Qualified

Final

Key: WR = World record

References

Women's 4x100 metre relay
Relay foot races at the Olympics
4 × 100 metres relay
1928 in women's athletics
Women's events at the 1928 Summer Olympics